Nexus Polaris is the second studio album by the Norwegian metal band Covenant, and was released in 1998 through Nuclear Blast.

This is the final album that the band would release under their Covenant name, as the proceeding year the group would change their name (and musical style) to The Kovenant, where they would begin performing electronic/industrial metal as opposed to symphonic black metal.

Album history 
The original album In Times Before the Light was successful at staging a fan base in the black metal scene in Norway. Nagash and Blackheart had greater ambitions for the band and wanted better production and pay for their music. Record label Nuclear Blast caught eye of the band and Covenant (as the band was known at that time) signed with them.

Starting the new album, Nagash and Blackheart wanted to form an actual band this time. They enlisted guitarist, Astennu (who was playing in Dimmu Borgir at the time with Nagash), keyboardist Sverd (of Arcturus), Sarah Jezebel Deva (of Cradle of Filth and other bands), and Hellhammer (of Mayhem). Nagash took over bass and vocal duties while Blackheart took guitar.

Nexus Polaris was hugely successful (due to Nuclear Blast's promotion) and allowed Covenant to do a two-week tour and was on national Norwegian television for six days. This was also a sign showing Covenant moving from black metal to a more industrial metal sound. Soon Covenant found themselves nominated for a Norwegian Grammy. They attended and won for Best Hard Rock band, the first ever.

A re-release of Nexus Polaris was made in 2002. The original tracks were left untouched (unlike the remixed edition of In Times Before the Light, also from 2002), but two versions of "New World Order", a song from their 1999 album Animatronic, were included as a bonus.

Track listing

Personnel 
 Nagash – vocals, bass
 Blackheart – guitars
 Astennu – guitar
 Sverd – keyboards
 Sarah Jezebel Deva – vocals
 Hellhammer – drums

Additional personnel
Per Heimly – photography
Flea Black – artwork, layout
Mathias – engineering
Siggi Bemm – producer, mastering
Andreas Marschall – cover art
Christophe Szpajdel – logo

References 

1998 albums
The Kovenant albums
Nuclear Blast albums